Charles Watkins (14 January 1921 – 22 February 1998) was a Scottish professional football player and manager. After starting out with Glasgow non-league club St Anthony's, he joined Rangers in 1942. Moving south with English Second Division club Luton Town in 1948, he made 239 appearances for the Bedfordshire club before retiring. Re-joining Luton in the early 1960s as part of the coaching staff, Watkins spent a short spell during the 1964–65 season as caretaker manager.

On leaving football, Charlie Watkins went on to run a newsagents for many years, with his family, in the Warden Hills area of Luton.

References

1921 births
1998 deaths
Scottish footballers
Rangers F.C. players
Luton Town F.C. players
Luton Town F.C. managers
Footballers from Glasgow
Scottish Football League players
English Football League players
Association football midfielders
Scottish football managers
Scottish Junior Football Association players
St Anthony's F.C. players